Niaz (also Romanized as Nīāz) is a village in Baba Jik Rural District, in the Central District of Chaldoran County, West Azerbaijan Province, Iran. At the 2006 census, its population was 53, in 11 families.

References 

Populated places in Chaldoran County